Tobin (from the Norman surname de St. Aubyn) is an Irish surname. Notable people with the name include:

 Tobin Bell (born 1942), American actor
 Tobin Esperance, American musician, member of the band Papa Roach
 Tobin Heath (born 1988), American soccer player
 Tobin Rote (1928–2000), American football player
 Tobin Sorenson (1955–1980), American rock climber
 Tobin Sprout (born 1955), American musician
 Matthew Tobin Anderson (born 1968), American author

See also

Tonin (name)

Unisex given names